Olav Vadstein (born 14 February 1955) is a Norwegian professor of Microbial Ecology at the Norwegian University of Science and Technology.

According to his web page, Vadstein is interested in aquatic ecosystems

"both natural and un-natural (human created). Besides basic aspects, I’m interested in applied microbial ecology, which can be placed under the heading Environmental Biotechnology."

His most highly cited papers are:
J. Skjermo, O. Vadstein, Techniques for microbial control in the intensive rearing of marine larvae in Aquaculture, 77, Issues 1–4, 1 July 1999, Pages 333-343- cited 378 times according to Google Scholar
Vadstein O. (2000) Heterotrophic, Planktonic Bacteria and Cycling of Phosphorus. In: Schink B. (eds) Advances in Microbial Ecology vol 16. Springer, Boston, MA- cited 184 times
Vadstein, O. The use of immunostimulation in marine larviculture: possibilities and challenges. Aquaculture Volume 155, Issues 1–4, 20 September 1997, Pages 401–417 Cited 179 times

References

Norwegian marine biologists
1955 births
Living people